A bar-back or barback (commonly known as a runner in Europe or a glassy in Australia) is a bartender's assistant. Bar-backs work in nightclubs, bars, pubs, restaurants, and catering halls, and usually receive a portion of the bartender's tips. At high-volume bars, the tips are divided where more than one bar-back is present. Bar-backs are often under the tutelage of bartenders and work their way up to a bartending job.

Bar-backs are there to simplify a bartender's job and are involved in the bar preparation through stocking the bar with liquor, ice, glassware, beer, garnishes, and so on; during the evening, they collect and wash dirty dishes and glassware, clean tables, change kegs, and help to pack up the bar after closing time. While the legal drinking age in the United States is 21, the minimum age to work as a bartender or bar-back varies from 18 to 21.

See also
 List of public house topics

References

Further reading
 

Bartending